Anstenoptilia is a genus of moths in the family Pterophoridae.

Species
Anstenoptilia hugoiella Gielis, 1996
Anstenoptilia marmarodactyla (Dyar, 1903)

Platyptiliini
Moth genera